Live at Montreux Jazz Festival is a live album by guitarist Carlos Santana and saxophonist Wayne Shorter that was released in 2005. The album is a record of their performance at the Montreux Jazz Festival on July 14, 1988.

Background
Santana and Shorter played together before, on The Swing of Delight (1980), and on This Is This! (1986), the final album by Weather Report, though Shorter left halfway through recording the album. Two years later he played at the jazz festival in Montreux, Switzerland, with musicians that were mostly from Santana's band: José Areas, Armando Peraza, Leon "Ndugu" Chancler, and keyboardist Chester Thompson. Bass guitarist Alphonso Johnson was from Weather Report. There was also a DVD-Video of the concert.

Track listing

Disc one 
"Spiritual" (John Coltrane) – 8:20
"Peraza" (Armando Peraza, David Sancious) – 9:20
"Shhh" (Patrice Rushen) – 8:27
"Incident at Neshabur" (Alberto Gianquinto, Santana) – 4:20
"Elegant People" (Shorter) – 4:40
"Goodness and Mercy" (Santana, Thompson) – 9:50
"Sanctuary"  (Shorter) – 4:55

Disc two 
"For Those Who Chant" (Luis Gasca) – 5:11
"Blues for Salvador" (Santana, Thompson) – 6:46
"Fireball 2000" (Rushen) – 8:29
"Ballroom in the Sky"  (Shorter) – 7:20
"Once It's Gotcha" (Santana, Thompson, Johnson, Jeffrey Cohen, Tom Coster) – 8:59
"Mandela" (Peraza) – 8:22
"Deeper, Dig Deeper" (Santana, Thompson, Buddy Miles, Sterling Crew) – 8:41
"Europa (Earth's Cry Heaven's Smile)" (Santana, Coster) – 6:10

DVD-Video 

"Peraza"
"Shhh"
"Incident At Neshabur"
"Elegant People"
"Percussion Solo"
"Goodness & Mercy"
"Sanctuary" / "Let The Music Speak"
"Blues For Salvador"
"Fireball 2000"
"Ballroom In The Sky"
"Once It's Gotcha"
"For Those Who Chant"
"Mandela"
"Deeper, Dig Deeper"
"Europa"
"Interview"

Personnel 
Musicians
 Carlos Santana – guitar
 Wayne Shorter – saxophone
 Patrice Rushen  – keyboards
 Chester D. Thompson – keyboards
 Alphonso Johnson – bass guitar
 Leon "Ndugu" Chancler – drums
 Armando Peraza – congas
 José Chepito Areas – timbales

Production
 Carlos Santana – executive producer
 Joel Jaffe – producer, engineer
 Marc Dimmitt – engineer
 Ken Friedman – photography
 Mark Brady – photography

References 

2005 live albums
Wayne Shorter live albums
Carlos Santana live albums
Albums recorded at the Montreux Jazz Festival